Flaco Jiménez is a studio album released by American performer Flaco Jiménez. It was released on October 25, 1994, by Arista Records. Jiménez was awarded the Best Mexican-American/Tejano Music Performance at the 38th Grammy Awards with the album.

Track listing

Chart performance

References

1994 albums
Flaco Jiménez albums
Spanish-language albums
Arista Records albums
Grammy Award for Best Mexican/Mexican-American Album